The 2014–15 Primera División season is the 33rd professional season of Venezuela's top-flight football league.

Teams
Eighteen teams participated this season, sixteen of whom remain from the previous season. Atlético El Vigía and Yaracuyanos were relegated after accumulating the fewest points in the 2013–14 season aggregate table. They will be replaced by Metropolitanos and Portuguesa, the 2013–14 Segunda División winner and runner-up, respectively.

Torneo Apertura 
The Torneo Apertura will be the first tournament of the season. It began in August 2014 and ended in December 2014.

Standings

Torneo Clausura 
The Torneo Clausura will be the second tournament of the season. It began in February 2015 and ended in May 2015.

Standings

Aggregate table

Serie Final
Deportivo Táchira and Trujillanos qualified to the Serie Final, which was contested on a home and away basis.

Serie Sudamericana
Other than the teams which already qualify for the Copa Libertadores (Apertura and Clausura champions and the best-placed team in the aggregate table) and the Copa Sudamericana (Copa Venezuela champion and the second best-placed team in the aggregate table), the eight best-placed teams in the aggregate table will contest in the Serie Sudamericana for the remaining two berths to the Copa Sudamericana, which qualify the two winners to the First Stage.

In the first round, the matchups are:
Match A (1 vs. 8)
Match B (2 vs. 7)
Match C (3 vs. 6)
Match D (4 vs. 5)
In the second round, the matchups are:
Winner A vs. Winner C
Winner B vs. Winner D
For the two second round winners, the team with the better record in the aggregate table will receive the Venezuela 3 berth, while the other team will receive the Venezuela 4 berth.

First round

Match A

Match B

Match C

Match D

Second round

Winner A vs. Winner B

Winner C vs. Winner D

External links 
  of the Venezuelan Football Federation 
Season regulations 
Football-Lineups 

2014 in South American football leagues
2015 in South American football leagues
Venezuelan Primera División seasons
2014–15 in Venezuelan football